Tensung FC is a Bhutanese professional football club which competes in the Bhutan Premier League, the top tier of Bhutanese football.

History
In Tensung's first Thimphu League season in 2016, the club finished 7th with a goal difference of −28. They registered their first point in April, holding Thimphu FC to a 0–0 draw.

References

Football clubs in Bhutan
Military association football clubs
2016 establishments in Bhutan
Association football clubs established in 2016